Manuel Cabral de Melo e Alpoim (1589–1676) was a Portuguese nobleman in the service of the Spanish Empire. He was one of the most prominent military and politicians of the Río de la Plata towards the beginning of the 17th century.

He served as alcalde and teniente de gobernador de Corrientes Province (Argentina). He also had an outstanding participation as a landowner, dedicated to cimarron cattle, being one of the most powerful accioneros (hunting) of the Viceroyalty of Peru.

Biography 

He was born in Vila do Porto, Santa Maria Island, son of Amador Vaz de Alpoim and Margarida Cabral de Melo, belonging to the Portuguese nobility. He arrived in Buenos Aires from Rio de Janeiro in the company of their parents in 1598. His family had lived for five years in the Portuguese colony of Brazil, in which they had taken refuge after the earthquake in the Azores islands of 1591.

He began his studies in the Jesuit College of Buenos Aires, to continue his education at Lisbon (Portugal). In 1613, he returned to Buenos Aires, and began to work in his father's business. By the year of 1617 his father dies in Buenos Aires, and his mother towards the year of 1630.

After completing his studies, he occupied several military and government posts, including the positions of alcalde, regidor and Maestre de Campo. His first public office was in 1621, when he was appointed as Alcalde de la Hermandad, serving in the suburban and provincial area of Buenos Aires. Later he held the position of Regidor of the Cabildo de Buenos Aires, having an active participation in matters related to the Río de la Plata.

Towards the middle of 1620 he moved to the city of Corrientes, where he was appointed to the position of Lieutenant Governor of Province in 1629. He led the crackdown against the rebel Indians, who in 1628, had murdered the Spanish Jesuits among them Roque González de Santa Cruz, cowardly attacked by the cacique Ñezú in reduction of San Nicolás, located across the Uruguay River. Commanding an army of 200 soldiers of Guarani origin, departed from the city of Itatí to Rio Grande do Sul, in support of the Jesuits. The rapid intervention of Alpoim, saved the lives of hundreds of people. Also gave approximately 40.000 cattle for creating stays in the area.

The heart of Roque González de Santa Cruz, burned and pierced with an arrow, was found by Alpoim inside a bag of relics. His heart wrapped in the blanket, was escorted by soldiers of Captain Alpoim to the city of Corrientes.

He held the position of Lieutenant of Governor of Corrientes between 1629 and 1633, and 1634 and 1636. And was elected Alcalde of first vote of Corrientes in 1656.

He also devoted himself to agriculture and livestock in Buenos Aires and Corrientes. In 1620 he had obtained permission for the exploitation of "ganado cimarron" (wild cattle and horses), of great abundance in the areas of the Province of Buenos Aires. He had a ranch in Monte Grande, and also ran his mother's ranch in Luján. In 1627 Pedro de Vera y Aragón made sale of his rights of Accionero Mayor del Ganado Vacuno, with jurisdiction in the city of San Juan de Vera de las Siete Corrientes.

Alpoim was a man highly respected by the natives of the area. He granted free licenses for cattle hunting to the Indians of the Reductions, to feed their families.

In 1637 and 1638, he participated in expeditions against the rebel tribes that inhabited in the region of Calchaquí Valleys. The expeditions were led by Governor Pedro Dávila Enriquez and its successor Mendo de la Cueva.

Manuel Cabral de Melo y Alpoim had an active participation as a member of the provincial militias of the Spanish army in Buenos Aires. He used various weapons for combat and defense, including two arquebus, a sword and an iron spear.

Family and Ancestors 
Manuel Cabral de Melo was twice married, 1st, to Inés Arias de Mansilla, daughter of Francisco Arias de Mansilla (regidor) and Lucía de Espinosa. And to 2dly, with Juana Delgado de Espinosa, daughter of Captain Francisco Delgado de Ledesma and Jerónima de Espinosa. He had two daughters Margarita and Gregoria, and a son, Juan Cabral de Alpoim y Arias de Mansilla, alcalde, regidor and landowner of Corrientes Province.

He was a distant descendant of the Royal Houses of Portugal, Castile, France and England. His father, was a descendant of Charles de La Cerda, through his fourth grandfather, João Gonçalves de Alpoim. His mother Margarida Cabral de Melo, was directly related to the Portuguese Royal houses by paternal and maternal line. Among his illustrious ancestors include the kings Afonso III of Portugal and  John of England, through of Álvaro Martins Homem, a great-great-grandfather of Manuel Cabral de Melo y Alpoim.

His ancestry was certified by a Cartório da Nobreza (certificate of nobility) delivered in Lisbon by the King of Arms of Portugal.
  
Manuel Cabral de Melo e Alpoim claimed that his direct paternal ancestors were medieval knights of France, probably of Norman origin. His maternal ancestors were relatives to Gonçalo Velho Cabral and Pedro Álvares Cabral, discoverers of Azores and Brazil.

In the city of Corrientes is found the National Historical Museum named, Museo Histórico de Corrientes Tte. Gdor. Manuel Cabral de Melo Alpoín.

References 

1589 births
1676 deaths
People from Santa Maria Island
Portuguese nobility
Portuguese military personnel
17th-century Portuguese military personnel
Azorean nobility
Ranchers
Explorers of Argentina
Corrientes
People from Corrientes
Spanish colonial governors and administrators